Counties 2 Cornwall (sponsored by St Austell Brewery using the Tribute brand name) is an English level eight rugby union league for clubs based in Cornwall. The champions are promoted to Counties 1 Western West and two teams are relegated to Counties 3 Cornwall. For the first time, reserve teams are allowed to participate. The current champions are Bodmin and due league reorganisation, will remain in this league.

Until the 2021–22 it was known as Tribute Cornwall League 1 and was a level nine league. It has been running continually since the 1987–88 season. The champions were promoted to the Cornwall/Devon, and the runner-up played the second team in Devon 1, with the winning team gaining promotion. One or two teams were usually relegated to Cornwall 2.

Current season

Participating teams and locations

2021–22

Participating teams and locations

League table

2020–21
Due to the COVID-19 pandemic, the 2020–21 season was cancelled.

2019–20

Participating teams and locations

League table

2018–19

Participating teams and locations

League table

2017–18
The format was the same as the previous season with Cornwall 1 and Cornwall 2 playing in a fifteen team Tribute Cornwall League. The teams played each other once in the first phase and after Christmas the teams split into two leagues, with the top eight playing in Cornwall One and the remainder playing in Cornwall Two.

Phase 1

Participating clubs

League table
 To be completed

Phase 2

League table

2016–17
For the first time Cornwall 1 and Cornwall 2 were amalgamated to create the Tribute Cornwall League with fifteen teams playing each other once in the first phase. After Christmas the teams split into two leagues with the top eight playing in Cornwall One and the remainder playing in Cornwall Two. Hayle won the Tribute Cornwall League before Christmas and the Cornwall 1 title with two matches to play, and were promoted to Cornwall/Devon for the following season (2017–18). Newquay Hornets came second and were due to play Torrington (from Devon 1) in the play-off for the third promotion place; Newquay declined to play the match and Torrington were promoted.

Phase 1

Participating clubs

League table

Phase 2

League table

Promotion play-off
Each season, the runners-up of Cornwall 1 and Devon 1, participate in a play-off for promotion to Cornwall/Devon. Newquay Hornets declined to play the match and Torrington were promoted.

2015–16
The 2015–16 Cornwall League 1 consisted of eight teams; each team playing the others twice, home and away. The season started on 10 October 2015 and the last league matches were played on 16 April 2016. Lanner won the title, in only their second season in league rugby, following promotion last year from Cornwall League 2. Camborne School of Mines finished second and were due to play Topsham from Devon 1 for the remaining promotion place to the Cornwall/Devon League. The match did not take place and Topsham were promoted.

Participating clubs

League table

Promotion play-off
Each season, the runners-up of Cornwall 1 and Devon 1, participate in a play-off for promotion to Cornwall/Devon. Camborne School of Mines were due to play Topsham at a venue and date to be decided. The match was not played and Topsham were promoted.

2014–15
The 2014–15 Cornwall League 1 consists of eight teams; each team playing the others twice, home and away. The season started on 4 October 2014 and the league matches were due to finish on 24 January 2015, but owing to postponements finished on 14 February. The champions, Newquay Hornets are promoted to Cornwall/Devon while the second place team, Veor lost 3 – 47 against Plymstock Albion Oaks, the runner-up of Devon 1, in a play-off for promotion to Cornwall/Devon. Roseland and Stithians are relegated to Cornwall 2.

Participating clubs

League table

Promotion play-off
Each season, the runners-up of Cornwall 1 and Devon 1, participate in a play-off for promotion to Cornwall/Devon. Plymouth Albion Oaks beat the home team Veor 47 – 3.

2013–14
The 2013–14 Cornwall 1 kicked off on 28 September 2013 and was due to finish on 8 February 2014, but owing to postponements finished on 1 March. The league consisted of eight clubs, with each team playing the others twice; home and away. Liskeard-Looe were unbeaten winning thirteen of their fourteen matches, finished as champions and will next season play in Cornwall/Devon. The runner-up, Bodmin, beat the second placed team Totnes, from Devon 1 in a play-off for promotion. St Agnes are relegated to Cornwall 2.

Participating clubs

League table

Promotion play-off
Each season, the runners-up of Cornwall 1 and Devon 1, participate in a play-off for promotion to Cornwall/Devon. Plymouth Albion Oaks beat the home team Veor 47 – 3.

2012–13

Participating clubs

League table

2011–12

For the previous two season Cornwall 1 and Cornwall 2 were amalgamated, this season the leagues' returned to their original format with the re-introduction of Cornwall 2. Cornwall 1 was reduced to seven teams playing each other three times to make eighteen games each.

Saltash, the champions, are promoted to the Cornwall/Devon League for season 2012–13. Helston played against the runner–up from Devon 1, losing the play-off for a place in the Cornwall/Devon League. There was no relegation.

2010–11

Veor, the champions, are promoted to the Cornwall/Devon for season 2011–12. The runner-up, Pirates Amateurs beat Wessex (Devon 1) 29 – 20 in the play-off and were also promoted. St Day, Perranporth, Illogan Park, St Agnes, and Redruth Albany were relegated to the re-formed Cornwall 2. Lankelly-Fowey withdrew during the season and their results expunged from the table.

2009–10

For two seasons, 2009–10 and 2010–11, the size of the league was increased to twelve teams by amalgamating with Cornwall League 2. 
Roseland, the champions, are promoted to Cornwall/Devon for season 2010–11. Veor, the runner-up lost to Honiton in the promotion play-off and continued to play in the Tribute Cornwall League.

2008–09

Stithians as champions, were promoted to Cornwall/Devon for season 2009–10. With an increase from twelve to sixteen teams in the aforementioned league, St Austell and Liskeard-Looe were also promoted. The two Cornwall leagues amalgamated for the following season and Camborne School of Mines, Illogan Park, Lankelly-Fowey, Redruth Albany, St Agnes, St Day and Veor joined the remaining teams for 2009–10.

2007–08

1989–90

League table

1988–89

League table

1987–88

Original teams
When league rugby began in 1987 this division contained the following teams:

Bodmin
Bude
Helston
Illogan Park
Liskeard-Looe
Redruth Albany
Saltash
St Agnes
St Just
Stithians
Wadebridge Camels

Cornwall League 1 honours

Cornwall League 1 (1987–1993)
The original Cornwall 1 (sponsored by Courage) was a tier 9 league with promotion to Cornwall/Devon and relegation to Cornwall 2.

Cornwall League 1 (1993–96)
The creation of National 5 South for the 1993–94 season meant that the Cornwall League 1 dropped to become a tier 10 league. Promotion was to Cornwall/Devon and relegation to Cornwall 2. The league continued to be sponsored by Courage.

Cornwall League 1 (1996–2009)
The cancellation of National 5 South at the end of the 1995–96 season saw Cornwall League 1 return to being a tier 9 division. Promotion continued to Cornwall/Devon and relegation to Cornwall 2. From the 2008–09 season onward the league was sponsored by Tribute.

Cornwall League (2009–2011)
For the 2009–10 season Cornwall 1 and Cornwall 2 were combined into a single division at tier 9 of the league system. Promotion was to Cornwall/Devon and there was no relegation.

Cornwall League 1 (2011–2016)
The splitting of the Cornwall League back into two separate divisions, saw Cornwall 1 remain at tier 9 of the league system. Promotion continued to Cornwall/Devon and relegation was once again to Cornwall 2.

Cornwall League 1 (2016–2018)
The 2016–17 season saw the Cornwall leagues restructured. For the first half of the season, all the clubs from Cornwall 1 and Cornwall 2 play in a single tier 9 division. In the second half of the season league the teams divided into Cornwall 1 and Cornwall 2 leagues based on their league positions. Promotion continued to Cornwall/Devon and there was no relegation.

Cornwall League 1 (2018–2022)
The 2018–19 season saw Cornwall 1 revert to being a tier 9 league with promotion to Cornwall/Devon and relegation to Cornwall 2.

Cornwall League 1 (2022– )
From 2022–23 season Cornwall 1 is a tier 8 league with twelve teams participating. Promotion is to Counties 1 Tribute Western West and relegation to Counties 3 Tribute Cornwall.

Promotion play-offs
Since the 2000–01 season there has been a play-off between the runners-up of Cornwall League 1 and Devon League 1 for the third and final promotion place to Cornwall/Devon. The team with the superior league record has home advantage in the tie. At the end of the 2019–20 season the Devon League 1 teams have been the most successful with thirteen wins to the Cornwall League 1 teams five; and the home team has won promotion on twelve occasions compared to the away teams six.

Number of league titles

Saltash (5)
Liskeard-Looe (4)
Veor (4)
Hayle (3)
Newquay Hornets (3)
Bude (2)
Falmouth (2)
Perranporth (2)
St Austell (2)
 Bodmin (1)
Illogan Park (1)
Lanner (1)
Roseland (1)
St Just (1)
Stithians (1)
Wadebridge Camels (1)

Notes

Sponsorship
The Cornwall One League was part of the Courage Clubs Championship and sponsored by Courage Brewery from the first season, 1987–88 to season 1996–97. The league was unsponsored until season 2007–08 when St Austell Brewery sponsored South-west based leagues under the Tribute Ale label.

See also

 South West Division RFU
 Cornwall RFU
 English rugby union system
 Rugby union in Cornwall

References

External links
 Trelawny's Army

 
20th century in Cornwall
21st century in Cornwall
3
9
Sports leagues established in 1987